Muʿāwiya ibn al-Mughīra ibn Abī al-ʿĀs ibn Umayya was a member of the Banu Umayya alleged to be a spy against the Muslims during the time of the Islamic prophet Muhammad. He was captured during the Invasion of Hamra al-Asad, where Muhammad accused him of being a Meccan spy, he was  the cousin of Uthman ibn Affan, had been captured after Uhud. Uthman gave him shelter. He was given a grace period of three days and arranged a camel and provisions for his return journey to Mecca.  Uthman departed with Muhammad for Hamra-al-Asad, and Muawiya overstayed his grace. Though he fled by the time the army returned, Muhammad ordered his pursuit and execution. The orders were carried out.

This incident is also mentioned in Ibn Ishaq and Ibn Hisham's biography of Muhammad.

See also
List of battles of Muhammad

References

625 deaths
7th-century executions
7th-century Arabs
Date of birth unknown
Date of death unknown
Place of birth missing
Place of death unknown
Banu Umayya